Křovák's projection is conic projection invented by Czech geodesist Josef Křovák.

The projection is based on Bessel ellipsoid and it was made for the best projection of Czechoslovakia. It is used for State maps of the Czech Republic.

External links 
 . Research Institute of Geodesy, Topography and Cartography.

Map projections